Robert Jean-François Joseph Pascal Lapointe (16 April 1922 – 29 June 1972), better known by his stage name Boby Lapointe, was a French actor and singer, noted for his humorous texts, alliterations and plays on words.

Biography
Lapointe was born in Pézenas, in the Hérault département of southern France. A brilliant pupil, he prepared for the entrance exam to the Centrale (engineering school) and Sup-Aero at Montpellier, but was conscripted into the Youth Building Projects in 1942 and sent to Linz, Austria, in 1943 for compulsory work service. He escaped the same year, and found work as a diver in La Ciotat, a suburb of Marseille, in 1944.

In 1946, he married Colette Maclaud. They had two children, Ticha (born 1948) and Jacky (1950).

His first published work, Les douze chants d'un imbecile, appeared in 1951. He moved to Paris and opened a fashion and baby clothes shop, still writing and producing plays. Later, he switched to being a fitter of TV aerials and began singing.

His fame grew when the actor Bourvil sang Lapointe's song Aragon et Castille in the 1954 film Poisson d'avril. In 1960, film director François Truffaut offered him a part in Tirez sur le Pianiste in which he sang Framboise, accompanied by Charles Aznavour on piano. This marked the start of a career that saw Lapointe perform at major venues throughout France. His joyful character led him to build friendships with the likes of Anne Sylvestre, Raymond Devos, Jacques Brel and Georges Brassens.

Lapointe was also a mathematician, and developed the bibi-binary system (also known in French as the système Bibi) in 1971.

Gallery
The town of Pézenas contains a monument to Lapointe (in the Place Boby Lapointe) and 7 carved stone sculptures relating to the man and his songs.

List of songs

Filmography
Filmography as actor:
 1960: Shoot the Piano Player, as The Singer
 1970: , as The Farmer
 1970: The Things of Life, as the driver of the animal transporter
 1970: Chapaqua's Gold, as Chapagua
 1971: Max et les ferrailleurs, as Lui Serafino / 'P'tit Lu'
 1971: Les assassins de l'ordre, as Louis Casso
 1971: , as Honoré
 1971: Appointment in Bray, as the inn keeper
 1971: The Widow Couderc, as Désiré

Notes

External links

 Boby Lapointe at the Internet Movie Database
 Vidéo: Boby Lapointe in 1967, singing Saucisson de cheval, an archive of Télévision Suisse Romande
 Bibibinary system in French Wikipedia

1922 births
1972 deaths
People from Pézenas
20th-century French male actors
20th-century French male singers
French World War II forced labourers
French escapees
Escapees from German detention
French male singer-songwriters